Jean-Marc Juilhard (born 5 February 1940 in Saint-Sandoux) is a French politician who was a member of the Senate of France from 2001 to 2011. He represented the Puy-de-Dôme department and is a member of the Union for a Popular Movement Party.

References

External links
Page on the Senate website 

1940 births
Living people
French Senators of the Fifth Republic
Union for a Popular Movement politicians
Senators of Puy-de-Dôme